John Richard Dolly (December 12, 1917May 30, 1959) was a wide receiver in the National Football League. He played for the Pittsburgh Steelers. He graduated from West Virginia with a degree in agriculture.

References

External links
Past stats at DatabaseFootball.com

1917 births
1959 deaths
West Virginia Mountaineers football players
American football wide receivers
Pittsburgh Steelers players